Snow Kiss is the fourth single album by the South Korean boy group Teen Top. The album was released both digitally and physically on December 10, 2014. "Snow Kiss" was used as the lead single for the album.

Background and release
On December 5, Teen Top posted the image of their album cover on their official website. The seasonal album, Teen Top Snow Kiss. The new album includes the title track “Snow Kiss” is a love song which portrays couples in love as a sweet snow candy and “Merry Christmas” written by Changjo and as well as C.A.P’s new song “Winter Song.”

Track listing

Charts

Singles chart

Albums chart

References

2014 albums
Christmas albums by South Korean artists
Single albums
Teen Top albums